Domenicali is an Italian surname. Notable people with the surname include:

Antonio Domenicali (1936–2002), Italian cyclist
Stefano Domenicali (born 1965), Italian former Formula One team principal

Italian-language surnames